"Runaways" is a song by American rock band the Killers. It was released in 2012 as the lead single from their fourth studio album, Battle Born (2012). Carly Rae Jepsen covered the song on BBC Radio 1's Live Lounge.

Release
On July 2, 2012, the band released artwork for the track. On July 10, it received its first radio play on Radio 104.5 and KROQ in the United States and on BBC Radio 1 in the United Kingdom. On July 17, 2012 it was released on iTunes, debuting in the US Alternative top twenty songs at #17.

In the United Kingdom, "Runaways" was released on September 9, 2012.

Critical reception
The song has received positive reviews from music critics. Jon Dolan from Rolling Stone  gave the song three stars saying "The first single from the first Killers album in four years is an Eighties-rock fever dream that's crazily big, even by their grandiose standards: a Vesuvian gusher of Springsteen mythos, Toto-Journey power hooks and singer Brandon Flowers’ unmistakable commitment to unmistakable commitment."

Nicky Barrison from NME acclaimed the song, describing it like a grand return, adding "Four years after Day & Age saw them dip their toe into dancier waters, The Killers make their grand return with the Killersiest comeback single you could ever hope to hear. If Day & Age was a stylistic reaction to the unjust critical kicking their second record took, then 'Runaways' is the sound of the band re-embracing their inner Springsteen". Nolan Feening from Entertainment Weekly was receptive to "Runaways", commenting that the song "starts off gently with some bare-bones piano chords and not a whole lot else, but it gains momentum faster than you can remember the lyrics to 'Mr. Brightside'. Four minutes later, you've got a galloping desert rocker good enough to roll with the best of the Vegas quartet's catalog". Mark Richards from Stereoboard.com was enthusiastic about the tune and commented "'Runaways' is a great alternative summer song that will no doubt be buried in air play by the likes of Will Smith's 80s classic".

Nick Bassett from The Re-View praised "the beauty of its heartfelt, retrospective lyrics and rousing stadium chorus [which] stir that feeling of nostalgia that everyone can relate to."

Readers of Rolling Stone chose "Runaways" as the best song of the summer in Readers' Poll: The Top Best Songs of Summer 2012.  It was the #1 most downloaded song for South Africa in 2012.

Music video
The music video for the song, directed by Warren Fu, premiered on July 26, 2012. The clip starts with Flowers performing the song with a starry sky on the background. He is later joined by the remaining members of the band, and several backdrops are shown, including the Killers' hometown, Las Vegas.

In September 2012, "Runaways" received a nomination for Best Video at the Q Awards, but lost out to Keane's "Disconnected".

Chart performance
On July 17, 2012 it was released on iTunes in the United States, debuting in the US Alternative top twenty songs at number 17, and climbing to number 7.

In the United Kingdom, "Runaways" was released on September 9, and entered the UK Singles Chart at number 18, and remained in the top 20 the following week. This makes "Runaways" the Killers' 10th UK top 20 single.

Charts

Weekly charts

Year-end charts

Certifications

Accolades

Release history

References

The Killers songs
2012 singles
Songs written by Brandon Flowers
Song recordings produced by Steve Lillywhite
Song recordings produced by Brendan O'Brien (record producer)
Songs about marriage
2012 songs
Songs written by Dave Keuning
Songs written by Mark Stoermer
Songs written by Ronnie Vannucci Jr.
Music videos directed by Warren Fu